Life in the Raw is a 1933 American pre-Code Western film, based on Zane Grey's short story "From Missouri", directed by Louis King and written by Stuart Anthony. It was Claire Trevor's film debut.

Plot

Cast        
George O'Brien as Jim Barry
Claire Trevor as Judy Halloway
Greta Nissen as Belle
Francis Ford as Sheriff Myles
Warner Richmond as Harvey (H.B.) Lamson
Steve Pendleton as Tom Halloway 
Alan Edwards as Colonel Nicholai Petroff
Nigel De Brulier as McTavish

References

External links 
 

1933 films
Fox Film films
American Western (genre) films
1933 Western (genre) films
Films directed by Louis King
Films based on works by Zane Grey
American black-and-white films
1930s English-language films
1930s American films